Golian Rural District is a rural district (dehestan) in the Central District of Shirvan County, North Khorasan Province, Iran. At the 2006 census, its population was 7,889, in 1,995 families.  The rural district has 17 villages.

References 

Rural Districts of North Khorasan Province
Shirvan County